Keith Fraser may refer to:

 Keith Fraser (footballer) (1913–2003), Australian rules footballer
 Sir Keith Fraser, 5th Baronet (1867–1935), British Member of Parliament for Harborough
 J. Keith Fraser (born 1922), Canadian physical geographer
 Keith Fraser (Bay Area sportsman) (born 1937), American fisherman
 Keith Fraser (skier) (born 1968), Scottish-born skier who represented Swaziland at the 1992 Winter Olympics
 Keith Fraser (police officer), Chair of the Youth Justice Board of England and Wales, and senior UK police officer